The 1936 International Society for Contemporary Music Festival was the fourteenth edition of the festival. Held in Barcelona from 19 to 23 April 1936, just three months before the outbreak of the Spanish Civil War, it was one of the last major cultural events of the Second Spanish Republic. This edition is best remembered for the posthumous world premiere of Alban Berg's Violin Concerto on its inaugural day.

Programme
The compositions were selected in Barcelona from 28 December 1935 to 1 January 1936 by a jury formed by Ernest Ansermet, Edward J. Dent, Joan Lamote de Grignon, Anton Webern and Bolesław Woytowicz. Knudåge Riisager could not attend the meeting.

1 Anton Webern was scheduled to conduct Berg's Concerto and Krenek's Karl V, but he was replaced respectively by Scherchen and Ansermet, who also conducted the other three compositions.

References
 19 March 1936, p. 11 (PDF) La Vanguardia

ISMC 1936
\
1936 in music
1936 music festivals